Daphne Zohar (born sometime after 1968) is an American entrepreneur. She is the founder and CEO of PureTech Health, a biotechnology firm. PureTech went public in June 2015 and is a FTSE250 company.

She was named to the MIT Technology Review TR35 as one of the top innovators in the world under the age of 35. In 2010 she was selected by BioWorld, a widely read biotechnology industry publication, as one of 28 leaders predicted to be the "movers and shakers" of the biotechnology industry over the next twenty years. That same year, Zohar was also featured as one of “The Boston Area’s Top 15 Innovators” by The Boston Globe. In 2011, Zohar was named one of Boston Business Journal’s “Women to Watch,” in 2012, she was named one of the most powerful female voices in healthcare innovation and on Twitter by MedCity News, and in 2013, Scott Kirsner of The Boston Globe named Zohar one of the 10 most influential women in biotech.

Zohar has also been vocal in criticizing the venture industry for its treatment of entrepreneurs.

References

External links
 http://puretechhealth.com/

Living people
American health care businesspeople
American venture capitalists
American women investors
Year of birth missing (living people)
21st-century American businesswomen
21st-century American businesspeople